is a song by Japanese pop singer Kana Nishino. It was released as her 10th single on May 19, 2010. The song is produced by Giorgio Cancemi, writer of many of Nishino's hit songs (such as "Best Friend," "Motto..." and "Tōkutemo"). The B-side "Love Is Blind" is produced by contemporary R&B producer Hiro. Hiro produced "One Way Love," the B-side to Nishino's previous single "Best Friend."

Promotion

The song is being used in commercials for fashion jewellery company GemCerey. Nishino also worked together with Gencerey to create a special Kana Nishino line on jewellery products, including necklaces, rings and cellphone straps.

"Love Is Blind" is being used in commercials for Æon, featuring tarento Yukina Kinoshita.

Chart performance
The song debuted at No. 1 on the RIAJ Digital Track Chart, and is her fourth successive single to reach number-one. "Aitakute Aitakute" peaked at No. 24 on the Billboard Japan Hot 100 due to airplay alone. The song has debuted at number two on Oricon's daily charts, under boyband Arashi's "Monster".

Track listing

Charts

Reported sales

References

External links
Sony Music Aitakute Aitakute profile 

Kana Nishino songs
2010 singles
RIAJ Digital Track Chart number-one singles
Japanese-language songs
2010 songs
SME Records singles